Total Linhas Aéreas S/A is an airline based in Curitiba, Brazil, founded in 1988. It operates cargo and charter services.

History
The airline has its origins in 1988 as air taxi company called Total Aero Taxi, owned by Grupo Empresarial Rota.

In December 1994 Total was sold to Transportadora Sulista S/A, a group specialized in road transportation. It is from this time that dates the letter S that can be seen on its logo.

In 1996 Total started operating as a regular regional air carrier with authorization for passenger and cargo transportation, operating its own flights and also on behalf of other Brazilian airlines such as Transbrasil.

In 1999 Total participated with Interbrasil STAR in the creation of a shuttle service between Rio de Janeiro-Santos Dumont and Belo Horizonte-Pampulha using mostly the ATR-42 of Total.
 
On Nov 13, 2007 TRIP Linhas Aéreas and Total Linhas Aéreas agreed to merge, and in May 2008, after approval by the National Civil Aviation Agency of Brazil, the merger was concluded. According to this agreement, all passenger services were transferred to TRIP Linhas Aéreas whereas charter and cargo flights remained under the brand Total Linhas Aéreas.

In May 2012, days before the announced purchase of TRIP Linhas Aéreas by Azul Brazilian Airlines Trip and Total were separated. However Total decided to continue with only cargo and charter flights operations.

Presently Total operates four ATR42-500 for regular charter flights, particularly for Petrobras in Amazonas and five Boeing 727-200F for cargo and nightmail flights as per contract with Brazilian Post and Telegraph Corporation and the Central Bank of Brazil, among others.

Destinations
As of July 2020 Total Linhas Aéreas regularly operated services to the following destinations in Brazil:

Fleet

Current fleet
As of April 2021, the fleet of Total Linhas Aéreas consisted of the following aircraft:

Former fleet
The airline previously operated the following aircraft:
 2 further ATR 42-500
 2 further Boeing 737-200F

Airline affinity program
Total Linhas Aéreas has no Frequent Flyer Program.

Accidents and incidents
 14 September 2002: Total Linhas Aereas Flight 5561 between São Paulo-Guarulhos and Londrina crashed while en route near Paranapanema. The crew of 2 died.
 30 May 2014: an ATR 42-500 took off from Porto Urucu Airport, on a domestic flight to Manaus. During the rotation, the captain noticed that the aircraft hit a tapir. Subsequently, the right main landing gear did not retract. The hydraulic systems were affected by the collision and the crew decided to proceed to Manaus with the landing gear down. During landing, after the touchdown of the right landing gear on the ground, the aircraft turned to the right. The crew managed to keep the aircraft within the lateral limits of the runway. None of the 59 occupants on board were injured.

See also
List of airlines of Brazil

References

External links
Total accidents as per Aviation Safety Database

Airlines of Brazil
Airlines established in 1988
Companies based in Minas Gerais
Cargo airlines of Brazil
1988 establishments in Brazil